John D. Marshall Jr. (April 26, 1930 – April 29, 2008) was an American football and tennis coach and college athletics administrator. He served as the head coach at Livingstone College in Salisbury, North Carolina from 1965 to 1972 and at Virginia State University in Petersburg, Virginia from 1974 to 1976, compiling a career college football coaching record of 38–64–1.

Marshall graduated from South Carolina State College—now known as South Carolina State University—and earned a master's degree from Indiana University. He began his coach career at Hillside High School in Heath Springs, South Carolina. In 1961 he moved to Elizabeth City State College—now known as Elizabeth City State University—in Elizabeth City, North Carolina as assistant football coach and head tennis coach. After spending a year as an assistant football coach and a professor of physical education at Langston University in Langston, Oklahoma, Marshall was hired as the head football coach at Livingstone in 1965. In 1973, he was hired as assistant professor of physical education and assistant football coach at Johnson C. Smith University in Charlotte, North Carolina.

In July 1979, Marshall became the athletic director at Virginia Union University in Richmond, Virginia. A year later he resign to take the same post at Fayetteville State University in Fayetteville, North Carolina.

Head coaching record

References

1930 births
2008 deaths
Elizabeth City State Vikings football coaches
Fayetteville State Broncos and Lady Broncos athletic directors
Johnson C. Smith Golden Bulls football coaches
Livingstone Blue Bears athletic directors
Livingstone Blue Bears football coaches
Langston Lions football coaches
Virginia State Trojans football coaches
Virginia Union Panthers athletic directors
College tennis coaches in the United States
High school football coaches in South Carolina
Indiana University alumni
Johnson C. Smith University faculty
Langston University faculty
South Carolina State University alumni
African-American coaches of American football
African-American college athletic directors in the United States
20th-century African-American people
21st-century African-American people